San Gaetano is a Roman Catholic church located on Corso Palladio #147 in the city of Vicenza, region of Veneto, Italy.

History
The church was erected between 1721 and 1730 using designs of Girolamo Frigimelica and commissioned by the Theatine order. The church underwent reconstruction after bombardment in 1944. The church still houses a St Cajetan painted by Francesco Solimena.

References

Roman Catholic churches in Vicenza
Roman Catholic churches completed in 1730
18th-century Roman Catholic church buildings in Italy